Doug Shaw Memorial Stadium is a 6,500-capacity  multi-use stadium located in Myrtle Beach, South Carolina. The stadium is named for Doug Shaw, Sr., the long-time coach of the Myrtle Beach High School Seahawks football team. During his reign on the sidelines, his Seahawk teams went to the AAA state championship game five years in a row, winning the title four times. The stadium is used for football, soccer, and track & field. It is the main venue for rectangular sports in Myrtle Beach but has been displaced by Brooks Stadium as the largest stadium in Horry County for those sports. It remains the county's premiere track & field venue.

The field surface is FieldTurf.

External links
 MB Herald article on upgrades

American football venues in South Carolina
Athletics (track and field) venues in South Carolina
Sports venues completed in 1968
High school football venues in the United States
Sports venues in Horry County, South Carolina
Soccer venues in South Carolina
Buildings and structures in Myrtle Beach, South Carolina
1968 establishments in South Carolina